Tacca ebeltajae is a plant in the Dioscoreaceae family, native to New Guinea and the Solomon Islands.

It was first described by Engbert Drenth in 1973.

References

External links
Tacca ebeltajae images & occurrence data from the GBIF

Tacca ebeltajae

Flora of New Guinea
Plants described in 1973